The List of Greek-language television channels includes the following channels:

List of television stations

Greece

Public National Channels (free-to-air, ERT)
ERT1
ERT2
ERT3
ERT News
Vouli TV (National network with programming produced by the Hellenic Parliament)

Private National Channels (free-to-air, Digea)
Alpha TV
ANT1
Makedonia TV
Mega Channel
Open TV
Skai TV
Star Channel

Private Subscription Channels

Cosmote TV Channels
Cosmote Cinema (Premium service with 3 channels)
Cosmote Series (Premium service with 2 channels)
Cosmote History
Cosmote Sport (Premium service with 10 channels)
Cosmote Sport Highlights
MAD Viral (Affiliate channel with MAD TV)
Sirina Entertainment (Premium adult service)
Village Cinema

Nova Channels
MAD Greekz (Affiliate channel with MAD TV)
Nova Cinema (Premium service with 4 channels)
Nova Life
Novasports (Premium service with 6 channels)
Novasports News
Novasports Start
Novasports Prime
Novasports Premier
Novasports Extra (4 channels)

Foreign Owned Specialty Channels
Animal Planet Greece (Nova)
Boomerang Greece (Nova)
BabyTV (Cosmote TV)
Blue Hustler
Discovery Channel Greece (Nova)
Disney Channel Greece
Disney Junior Greece
Euronews
Eurosport 1 (Nova)
Eurosport 2 (Nova)
FashionTV (Cosmote TV)
FX Greece
FX Life Greece
Hustler TV
Luxe TV (Cosmote TV)
Mezzo TV (Cosmote TV)
National Geographic Greece
National Geographic Wild
Penthouse (Cosmote TV)
Stingray CMusic (Cosmote TV)
Stingray iConcerts (Cosmote TV)
Travel Channel (Nova)

Local Channels
Athens - Attica
Action 24 - Marousi
a.Epsilon TV - Peristeri
Alert TV - Tavros
ART - Kallithea
Attica TV - Aspropyrgos
Blue Sky - Irakleio
Extra Channel - Peristeri
High TV - Athens
Kontra Channel - Tavros
MAD TV - Pallini
Nickelodeon Greece - Irakleio
One Channel - Athens
RISE TV - Irakleio
Smile TV - Rizoupoli

Thessaloniki - Central Macedonia
4E TV - Ampelokipoi
a.Epsilon TV - Thessaloniki
Atlas TV - Nea Moudania and Thessaloniki
Dion TV - Thessaloniki and Kato Agios Ioannis
Egnatia TV - Giannitsa and Thessaloniki
Euro Channel - Kilkis and Evosmos
Europe One - Thessaloniki
Gnomi TV - Thessaloniki
Nickelodeon Plus - Thessaloniki
Pella TV - Giannitsa
Time Channel - Oraiokastro
TV 100 - Municipality of Thessaloniki
Vergina TV - Thessaloniki

Eastern Macedonia and Thrace
Alfa TV - Alexandroupolis
Center TV - Kavala
Delta TV - Alexandroupolis
Diktyo TV - Serres
ENA Channel - Kavala
Epiloges TV - Serres
Epsilon TV Delta - Drama
Lydia TV - Kavala
Next TV - Xanthi
Orestiada TV (Municipal) - Orestiada
Smile TV - Xanthi
Star TV - Drama
Thraki NET - Alexandroupolis
TV Rodopi - Komotini

Western Macedonia
Diktyo 1 - Kastoria
Flash TV - Kozani
Osios Nikanor - Kavala
TOP Channel - Kozani
West Channel - Kozani

Thessaly
Astra TV - throughout the region
FORMedia - Trikala, Larissa and Volos
Smile Plus - Larissa
Thessalia TV - Karditsa, Larissa and Volos
TRT - Volos, Larissa and Karditsa

Epirus
Art TV - Arta
Epirus TV1 - Ioannina
ITV (Ioannina TV) - Ioannina
Vima TV - Ioannina

Central Greece
Acheloos TV - Agrinio
ENA TV - Lamia
Epsilon TV - Livadeia
Lepanto TV - Nafpaktos
Star Central Greece - Lamia

Peloponnese
Achaia Channel - Patras
a.NET - Kalamata
ART TV - Tripoli
Axion TV - Corinth
Best TV - Kalamata
Electra TV - Corinth
Ionian Channel - Patras
Lepanto TV - Patras
Lyxnos TV - Patras
Mesogeios TV - Kalamata
ORT - Pyrgos
Patra TV - Pyrgos and Patras
ProNews - Patras
RTP Center - Corinth
Super TV - Corinth

Ionian Islands
Corfu Channel - Corfu
Ionian Channel - Zakynthos
Start TV - Corfu

Aegean Islands
Aeolos TV - Mytilene
Alithia TV - Chios
Patrida TV - Chios
Samiaki TV - Samos
Syros TV1 - Ermoupoli
Volcano TV - Santorini

Dodecanese
Aigaio TV - Kalymnos
Irida TV - Rhodes
Kosmos TV - Ialysos
Kos TV (Municipal) - Kos
Tharri TV (Monastery) - Rhodes

Crete
a.Epsilon TV - Ierapetra
CreteTV - Nea Alikarnassos
Kriti TV1 - Chania
New Television - Chania
Notos TV - Nea Alikarnassos
Sitia TV - Nea Alikarnassos
TV Creta - Nea Alikarnassos

International Channels
4E TV (Europe/Middle East/Australia/Eurasia/South Africa)
Alpha Sat (USA/Canada/Australia/Middle East)
ANT1 Europe (Europe)
ANT1 Pacific (Australia)
ANT1 Satellite (USA)
ERT World 1 (Europe/Australia/Middle East)
ERT World 2 (Canada)
Greek Cinema (USA/Canada/Australia)
Greek Music Television (USA)
MAD World (USA/Canada/Australia)
MEGA Cosmos (Canada)
RIK Sat (USA/Canada/Australia)
Skai International (USA/Canada/Australia)
SportPlus TV (USA/Canada)
Star International (USA/Canada/Australia)

International Local Greek Channels
Greek Music Video Hits (USA)
Greek Orthodox Archdiocese of America (USA)
Hellenic TV (United Kingdom)
Montreal Greek TV (Canada)
New Greek TV (USA)
Odyssey (Canada)
Toronto Net TV (Canada)
WPSO (USA)
WZRA-CD (USA)

Defunct channels

Public Channels
Armed Forces Information Service
Cine+/Sport+
Cine+/Studio+
Prisma+
Sport+/Info+
DT
DT 2
DT HD
NERIT
NERIT Sports
NERIT Plus
NERIT HD
ERT Sports

Private National Channels
902 TV
Alter Channel
Tempo TV

Private Subscription Channels
Fox Sports
Fox Channel Greece
Fox Life Greece
Greek Business Channel
Holidays in Greece TV
MTV Music Greece
Universal Channel

Local Channels
Channel Nine
MTV Greece
MTV Plus
PLP
SBC
Super B
Super TV
Tele Time

International Channels
Alter Globe (USA/Australia)
ANT1 Prime (USA)
Blue (USA/Australia)
Mega Cosmos (USA/Australia)

See also
Television in Greece
Lists of television channels
List of radio stations in Greece
Television in Cyprus

External links
Greek TV Stations
Media.net.gr
World TV Stations

Lists of television channels by language
Greek-language television stations
Lists of mass media in Greece